Karakeqik is a township of Akto County in Xinjiang Uygur Autonomous Region, China. Located in the northeast of the county, the township covers an area of 108 square kilometers with a population of 5,728 (as of 2015). It has 4 administrative villages under its jurisdiction. Its seat is at Bostan Village .

Name

The name of Karakeqik is from Uighur language, meaning "spring water rivulet". There was once a rivulet formed by spring water in the east of the land, so it was named after that.

Geography and resources

Karakeqik Township is located between 75°07′- 75°38′ east longitude and 39°00′- 39°18′ north latitude, in the alluvial fans of the Gez River in the northwest of Akto County. It is bordered by Blaksu, Saybag and Wupar townships of Shufu County to the east, south and north, by Bostanterak Township of Wuqia County and Oytak Town to the west. It has a total area of 108 square meters with arable land area of 1,694 hectares (including shelter forest). The township is 43 kilometers away from the county seat and 37 kilometers away from Kashi City. As of 2015, there were 1,431 households with 5,728 people in the township.

The average elevation of Karakeqik is 1,300 meters. The terrain is high in the southwest and low in the northeast. It is surrounded by water on three sides and has a typical temperate continental arid climate. The annual rainfall is 80–120 mm, and the frost-free period is 220 days. There are two river systems, Gez River and Wupal River. The water source is sufficient, suitable for planting crops such as wheat, corn and rice.

Administrative divisions

The township has 4 administration villages and 29 unincorporated villages under its jurisdiction.

4 administration villages
 Binamu Village (Binamucun) 
 Bostan Village (Bositan)
 Koshdowe Village (Kuoshiduwei, Kuoshi Duweicun) 
 Toprelik Village (Tuopurelike)

 Unincorporated villages    
 Dongmahalla 
 Mazartograk 

Demographics

, the population of the township was 75.9% Uyghur.

References 

Township-level divisions of Akto County